Bharat Road Network Limited (BRNL) is a Road Build Operate Transfer company based in Kolkata, West Bengal, India. It was founded in 2006 to focus on development, implementation of roads and highways projects.

Projects
The project portfolio of BRNL consists of six road BOT projects, which are being developed on a public-private partnership (PPP) basis in Uttar Pradesh, Kerala, Haryana, Madhya Pradesh, Maharashtra and Odisha. Out of these, two projects are operational under final commercial operation date, three projects are operational under provisional COD and one project is under construction. The projects operational under final COD and provisional COD together cover approximately 1,622.44 lane km, including major and minor bridges. While the project under construction involves development of 400.24 lane km, including major and minor bridges.

References

External links
 

Construction and civil engineering companies established in 2006
2006 establishments in West Bengal
Indian companies established in 2006
Public–private partnership